Peanut or groundnut (Arachis hypogaea) is a species in the pea family Fabaceae, native to South America.

Peanut or Peanuts may also refer to:

Places
 Peanut, California, an unincorporated community
 Peanut, Pennsylvania, an unincorporated community
 Peanut Island, Florida
 The Peanut, a neighbourhood in Toronto, Ontario, Canada

Arts, entertainment, and media

Games
 Peanuts or Nertz, a form of double solitaire
 Peanuts, another name for Mercy (game), a hand war game

Music
 "Peanuts", a 1957 song by Little Joe and the Thrillers
 "Peanuts", a song from The Police's 1978 album Outlandos d'Amour
 The Peanuts, a singing duo

Film
 Peanuts (1996 film), a Japanese film by Takashi Miike
 Peanuts (2006 film), a Japanese film

Peanuts franchise
 Peanuts, a comic strip
 Peanuts (TV series), a television series based on the comic strip
 The Peanuts Movie, a 2015 film based on the comic strip

Other uses in arts, entertainment, and media
 Peanut, a puppet of ventriloquist Jeff Dunham
 Peanut, a television character in Harvey Birdman
 Peanut the Elephant, a Beanie Baby collectible toy
 Peanuts (horse), an American Thoroughbred racehorse
 Peanut, a recurring character in SuperKitties

Other uses
 Peanut (nickname), a list of people nicknamed either "Peanut" or "Peanuts"
 Peanut, name for IBM PCjr, a computer manufactured by IBM starting in 1984
 Peanut, a type of small pocketknife with two blades
 Foam peanuts, a packing material
 Mr. Peanut, mascot of the snack-food company Planters
 The smallest legally harvestable hard clams

See also
 P-Nut, the bassist for 311